This is an incomplete list of lakes of Bulgaria.

See also

 List of reservoirs and dams in Bulgaria
 List of rivers of Bulgaria

Bulgaria
Lakes